Janko Kastelic (born 10 January 1969) is a Canadian–Slovene conductor who was from September 2008 until June 2011 the music director for the Opera House of Maribor, Slovenia.

Biography 
Born in Ljubljana, capital of the Slovene Republic within the Federal Socialist Republic of Yugoslavia, and educated in Toronto, Ontario, Canada, he began his musical career at St. Michael's Choir School as a boy soprano and accompanist. He travelled the globe and acquired a vast musical repertoire ranging from Gregorian chant to 20th-century music. At a very young age, he acquired the gold medal in performance from the Western Ontario Conservatory of Music in both piano and organ. Upon graduation, he was accepted to the Edward Johnson Faculty of Music at the University of Toronto, where he continued his studies in conducting, theory, composition, and piano.

"My desire to learn and experience more" drove him back to Europe after his studies, where he attained a position as coach and assistant conductor at the State Opera of Slovenia and led simultaneously a baroque and wind orchestra. After three seasons, he was invited to the Opéra National de Paris as assistant coach and there began to work with prominent singers and conductors. In 2002 he won the position as an assistant in the Vienna State Opera, where he also conducted performances of Das Traumfresserchen, Aladdin and Bastien und Bastienne.

He has prepared works for the Klangbogen Festival Vienna and the Salzburger Festspiele and was the conductor of the TU Orchester Wien, where he led novel orchestra concerts focusing on French and Classical repertoire. He was responsible for the demanding choruses in Moses und Aron by Arnold Schoenberg at the Vienna State Opera in March 2007. In 2008 he conducted performances of Die Fledermaus by Johann Strauss at the Musik Theater Schönbrunn in Vienna.

Primarily conducting in Europe (including Austria, Italy, Spain, and Slovenia among others) he has also conducted in North America. Although his career as a conductor is predominant, Janko Kastelic tries to continue his work as a pianist and composer. Sought after as an accompanist and coach, he is also known for his organ and cembalo improvisations. 'A musician should be very diverse and broad-minded', thus he has composed music for film to pop festivals to Papal visits.

Educating children

Kastelic is a strong advocate of educating young people about the wonderful and diverse world of classical music. In September 2005, he was appointed as one of the musical leaders of the opera school for children at the Vienna State Opera, and they performed a staged-work arranged by him in June 2006 (Mozart Year) on lieder by Wolfgang Amadeus Mozart called Der kleine Friedrich written and staged by the writer Claudia Toman. Beyond education, he has conducted many performances of children's opera in Vienna.

SNG Maribor
Janko Kastelic was General Music Director of the Maribor Opera House from September 2008 until June 2011. In May 2009, he conducted Carmina Burana by Carl Orff in Ljubljana and Maribor. In September 2009 he conducted his first Premiere, The Queen of Spades by Pyotr Ilyich Tchaikovsky.

Notes

External links 
 SNG Maribor
 Opera Balletschool of the Vienna State Opera

1969 births
Music directors (opera)
Living people
Slovenian conductors (music)
Male conductors (music)
Musicians from Ljubljana
University of Toronto alumni
Slovenian emigrants to Canada
21st-century Canadian conductors (music)
21st-century Canadian male musicians